Petro Ivanovych Nishchynsky (September 9, 1832 – March 4, 1896) was a Ukrainian linguist and composer. He was born in the village of Nemenka, currently in the Vinnytsia Oblast of Ukraine.

External links
 Biography on the Encyclopedia of Ukraine
 Information from the Vinnytsia Oblast Universal Educational Library

1832 births
1896 deaths
People from Vinnytsia Oblast
Ukrainian composers
19th-century composers